Beka Kavtaradze (born 15 June 1999) is a Georgian football player.

Club career
He made his debut in the Russian Football National League for FC Nizhny Novgorod on 24 March 2021 in a game against FC Akron Tolyatti. He started the next game against FC Krasnodar-2 on 28 March 2021 and scored his first two FNL goals in a 3–0 victory.

On 10 June 2021, he signed with FC Rotor Volgograd.

References

External links
 Profile by Russian Football National League
 

1999 births
People from Mtskheta-Mtianeti
Living people
Footballers from Georgia (country)
Georgia (country) youth international footballers
Georgia (country) under-21 international footballers
FC Dinamo Tbilisi players
FC Metalurgi Rustavi players
FC Saburtalo Tbilisi players
FC Nizhny Novgorod (2015) players
FC Rotor Volgograd players
Association football forwards
Erovnuli Liga players
Russian First League players
Expatriate footballers from Georgia (country)
Expatriate footballers in Russia